Ochyrotica kurandica is a moth of the family Pterophoridae. It is only known from localities near Kuranda in northern Queensland.

The wingspan is about 16 mm. The forewings have a colour and pattern similar to Ochyrotica connexiva and Ochyrotica celebica, but the costal band is as wide as in O. celebica, whereas the dorsal band has the shape as in O. connexiva, with a clear acute spot at 1/3 of the dorsal length.

Adults are on wing in April, June and July.

External links
Australian Faunal Directory
Ochyrotica kurandica at Trin Wiki

Moths of Australia
Ochyroticinae
Moths described in 1988